The Restart Coalition is a centre-left political alliance in Croatia. The coalition was formed in 2010 as the Kukuriku Coalition (Kukuriku koalicija). This somewhat facetious name meaning 'cock-a-doodle-doo', taken from a restaurant of the same name in Kastav where the coalition leaders first convened in July 2009, became well known and was eventually taken as the coalition's official name. The coalition originally consisted of four centrist and centre-left parties in the Croatian Parliament: the Social Democratic Party of Croatia (SDP), Croatian People's Party – Liberal Democrats (HNS-LD), Croatian Party of Pensioners (HSU) and Istrian Democratic Assembly (IDS). The coalition won an absolute majority of seats in the 2011 parliamentary election and successfully formed a government led by Zoran Milanović (SDP).

In the 2014–15 presidential election the coalition supported the candidacy of incumbent president Ivo Josipović. He was, however, defeated by Kolinda Grabar-Kitarović of the centre-right Croatian Democratic Union (HDZ), becoming the first Croatian president to not win re-election.

For the 2015 parliamentary election, the coalition changed its name into Croatia is Growing (Hrvatska raste) - in reference to the continuous growth of economic indicators such as the GDP, industrial production, exports, and employment rate, which was achieved in the last two years of the mandate of the Milanović's government. The coalition was later joined by the Croatian Labourists – Labour Party (HL), Croatian Peasant Party (HSS) and Zagorje Party (ZS), while the IDS in turn left it. Nevertheless, the leader of the IDS, Boris Miletić, explicitly pointed out that his party would still continue to collaborate with the coalition. After the coalition failed to achieve a post-electoral agreement with the Bridge of Independent Lists (MOST) on the formation of the new government, it was required to move into the opposition.

On 16 July 2016, the SDP, HNS-LD, HSU and the HSS signed coalition agreement in Zabok and thus re-established the coalition under a new name - the People's Coalition (Narodna koalicija). Following the election, the coalition once again failed to return to the government and thus remained in the opposition.

The coalition's founder, former prime minister Zoran Milanović, was elected the 5th president of Croatia in the 2019–20 presidential election. He did so by defeated the incumbent, Kolinda Grabar-Kitarović, of the ruling HDZ.

In the run-up to the 2020 parliamentary election five parties agreed to form the Restart Coalition (Restart koalicija). These are the SDP, HSS, HSU, Civic-Liberal Alliance (GLAS) and Power - Party of People's and Civic Engagement (SNAGA), respectively. In May 2020 the coalition was joined by the Damir Bajs Independent List party and the Democratic Alliance of Međimurje, while in June 2020 the coalition was further expanded to include the Istrian Democratic Assembly and the Alliance of Primorje-Gorski Kotar (PGS). On 10 June 2020 Darinko Dumbović, the mayor of Petrinja, and a member of Parliament for the People's Party – Reformists (NS-R), signed a coalition agreement with the Restart Coalition in the 6th electoral district. Furthermore, on 12 June the Restart Coalition reached an agreement with Matija Posavec, the independent prefect of Međimurje County, on a joint electoral list for the 3rd electoral district.

History

Kukuriku Coalition
The idea of a joint party list of the main centre-left parties, the Social Democratic Party of Croatia (SDP) and Croatian People's Party (HNS-LD), was discussed in the 2007 general election, however ultimately each party contested the election separately. The election resulted in HDZ forming a Government led by Ivo Sanader and SDP and HNS-LD remaining in Opposition. After the resignation of Prime Minister Sanader in 2009, SDP, HNS-LD and the Istrian Democratic Assembly (IDS) started discussing the possibility of contesting the 2011 parliamentary election more extensively. On 23 November 2010 the three parties along with HSU signed a declaration "Alliance for Change" officially confirming their intention of a joint appearance in the next election.

On 15 September 2011, the coalition launched their manifesto for the 2011 general election called "Plan 21" in Zagreb. On 2011 elections Coalition won the majority in 8 out of 10 electoral districts which resulted in gaining 81 out of 151 seats in the Parliament. On 23 December 2015, the coalition formed the 10th Croatian Government led by Zoran Milanović. The coalition participated on the 2013 European Parliament election and won 5 out of 12 Croatian seats. For the 2014 European Parliament election, the coalition was joined by the Independent Democratic Serb Party eventually winning 4 out of 11 Croatian seats.

Croatia is Growing
For the 2015 parliamentary elections, the coalition changed its name into Croatia is Growing, and was joined by Croatian Labourists – Labour Party (HL), Croatian Peasant Party (HSS) and Zagorje Party (ZS), while the IDS left.  Nevertheless, leader of IDS Boris Miletić explicitly pointed out that his party would still continue to collaborate with the coalition, and has later took an active part in the 2015 post-election negotiations on forming new government as de facto member of the coalition. The coalition eventually ended up winning the majority in 5 out of 10 electoral districts and eventually gained 56 out of 151 seats in the Parliament. After more than 40 days of negotiations with the Bridge of Independent Lists (MOST) and numerous twists and turns mainly due to MOST frequently changing terms, the coalition failed to achieve agreement with MOST on forming new government, which was formed by the independent Tihomir Orešković who was supported by the centre-right alliance, the Patriotic Coalition. Coalition party members returned to the opposition. On 9 April 2016, president of HNS-LD, Ivan Vrdoljak, announced that the coalition ceased to exist since each party had its own parliamentary club adding that his party would still cooperate with its former coalition allies.

People's Coalition
On 9 July 2016, Zoran Milanović announced that the SDP, HNS-LD and Croatian Party of Pensioners (HSU) would form the People's Coalition (Narodna koalicija) for the 2016 parliamentary election, adding that the coalition would be ideologically far-reaching and diverse, as it also encompasses the centre-right Croatian Peasant Party (HSS). The three centre-left parties previously formed the Croatia is Growing coalition with the Croatian Labourists - Labour Party and two smaller parties winning 56 seats in the November 2015 parliamentary election, while the HSS contested the elections as part of the Patriotic Coalition which won 59 seats (2 of those going to HSS itself). One of HSS's two parliamentary representatives and former leader Branko Hrg left the party after the party joined the coalition. On the other hand, Authentic Croatian Peasant Party and Croatian Peasant Party of Radić Brothers which had more than 6.000 members decided to merge into HSS after they split from it in 2007 dissatisfied with HSS's cooperation with the Croatian Democratic Union (HDZ).

Restart Coalition
On 9 May 2020, the SDP, HSS, HSU, Civic-Liberal Alliance (Glas) and Power - Party of People's and Civic Engagement (SNAGA), launched a joint electoral programme and announced the beginning of their campaign for the 2020 parliamentary election. In mid-May 2020 the party led by Bjelovar-Bilogora County prefect Damir Bajs - called the Damir Bajs Independent List, joined the coalition. It was followed a few days later by the Democratic Alliance of Međimurje (MDS). In June 2020 the coalition was expanded when the original member parties agreed to terms set out by the Istrian Democratic Assembly (IDS) and the Alliance of Primorje-Gorski Kotar (PGS) for joining the common electoral lists. Namely, the IDS and the PGS had asked the Restart Coalition for certain reassurances, including a promise that Istria would be maintained as a separate political unit in any future administrative reform of Croatia's existing system of counties. Furthermore, in addition to its national-level coalition agreements, the Restart Coalition has also formed joint electoral lists with several parties and independent individuals at an electoral district level. These include Petrinja mayor and Member of Parliament Darinko Dumbović of the People's Party – Reformists (in the 6th electoral district), as well as non-partisan Međimurje County prefect Matija Posavec (in the  3rd electoral district). The Restart Coalition is led by SDP chairman Davor Bernardić, who is thus the alliance's prime-ministerial candidate.

Member parties

Former members

Election results

Parliamentary elections

Presidential elections

Former logos

See also
 Amsterdam Coalition
 Cabinet of Zoran Milanović

Notes

References

2010 establishments in Croatia
Political parties established in 2010
Political party alliances in Croatia
Social Democratic Party of Croatia